Cattaneo ( is an Italian surname.

Geographical distribution
As of 2014, 81.2% of all known bearers of the surname Cattaneo were residents of Italy (frequency 1:1,232), 9.0% of Argentina (1:7,742), 2.8% of Switzerland (1:4,802), 1.9% of the United States, 1.8% of France (1:59,595) and 1.2% of Brazil (1:290,914).

In Italy, the frequency of the surname was higher than national average (1:1,232) only in one region: Lombardy (1:223).

People
 Adelardo Cattaneo, (?–1225), cardinal
 Alberto Cattaneo (born 1967), Italian mathematician
 Annibale Cattaneo (?–1584), Italian Roman Catholic bishop
 Bartolomeo Cattaneo (1883–1949), Italian archbishop and diplomat 
 Bernadette Cattanéo (1899-1963), French trade unionist and militant communist
 Carlo Cattaneo (admiral) (1883–1941), Italian admiral
 Carlo Cattaneo (mathematician) (1911–1979), Italian mathematician
 Carlo Cattaneo (writer) (1801–1869), Italian nationalist, writer and philosopher
 Cristoforo Cattaneo (16th century), Italian humanist author
 Danese Cattaneo (1512–1572), Tuscan sculptor and medallist
 Francesco Costanzo Cattaneo (1602–1665), painter from Ferrara
 Atilio Cattáneo (1889-1957), Argentinian politician
 Hernán Cattáneo (1965–     ), Argentinian musician
 Lazzaro Cattaneo (1560–1640), Italian Jesuit, missionary in China
 Leonardo Cattaneo della Volta (1487– 16th century), a doge of Genoa
 Mattia Cattaneo (1990 - ), Italian professional road cyclist
 Peter Cattaneo (1964–    ), British film director
 Santo Cattaneo (1739–1819), Neoclassic painter from Brescia
 Simonetta Cattaneo Vespucci (1453–1476), noblewoman from Genoa.

See also
Gualdo Cattaneo, a small Italian town in Umbria
Carlo Cattaneo University, an Italian university

References

Italian-language surnames
Surnames of Italian origin